Monty Montgomery is an American film producer, director, actor and screenwriter.

Montgomery is best known for his work as producer on films such as Wild at Heart and The Portrait of a Lady. He co-directed one film, The Loveless (1981). 

Montgomery is also known for playing the role of The Cowboy in the David Lynch film Mulholland Drive.

References

External links

American film producers
American film directors
American male screenwriters
American male film actors
Living people
1963 births